Al-'Abbasiyya, also known as al-Yahudiya, was a Palestinian Arab village in the Jaffa Subdistrict. It was attacked under Operation Hametz during the 1948 Palestine War, and finally depopulated under Operation Dani. It was located 13 km east of Jaffa. Some of the remains of the village can be found today in the centre of the modern Israeli city of Yehud.

History
In 1596, Yahudiya appeared in Ottoman tax registers as being in the Nahiya of Ramla of the Liwa of Gaza. It had a population of 126 Muslim households and paid taxes on wheat, barley, summer crops or fruit trees, sesame, and goats or beehives.

In 1838 it was noted as a  Muslim   village called el-Yehudiyeh in the  Lydda administrative region.

The French explorer Victor Guérin visited the village, which he called Yehoudieh, in 1863, and found it to have a population of more than 1,000 people. The houses were made of adobe bricks, several topped by palm leaves. Near a noria he noticed an ancient sarcophagus, placed there as a trough.

An  Ottoman  village list from about  1870  found that  el-jehudie had  a population of 835, in  246  houses, though the population count included men, only.   

In 1882, the PEF's Survey of Western Palestine (SWP) described the place as "a large mud village, supplied by a pond, and surrounded by palm-trees." They also noted a ruined tank, or birkeh, to the south of the village.

British Mandate era
In the 1922 census of Palestine, conducted by the British Mandate authorities, Yahudiyeh had a population of 2,437 residents, all Muslims,  increasing in the  1931 census, when Yahudiya  had a population of 3,258 residents; 3,253 Muslims and 5 Christians, in a total of 772 houses.

In 1932, the town was officially renamed Al-'Abbasiyya, because the inhabitants did not want the town to be associated with Jews. The name chosen as a replacement, Al-'Abbasiyya, was mostly in honour of the memory of a sheikh called al-'Abbas who was buried in the town, but also alluded to the Arab Muslim Abbasid Caliphate.

In the 1945 statistics, the population had increased to 5,800; 5,630 Muslims, 150 Jews, and 20 Christians, with a total of 20,540 dunums  of land. Of this, a total of 4,099 dunums was used for citrus and bananas,  1,019 dunums were irrigated or used for orchards, 14,465 were for cereals,   while 101 dunams were classified as built-up areas.

On December 13, 1947, twenty-four armed men from the hard-right paramilitary organization Irgun attacked the village, approaching from the Jewish town of Petaḥ Tiqvah. The attackers wore khaki uniforms and drove through the village in four cars. One group fired on villagers at a cafe and another set bombs and grenades in houses. Seven Arabs were killed (two women and two children under the age of five) and seven others seriously wounded (two women and a four-year-old girl among them). An armored British police vehicle was fired upon by the attackers.

1948 and after
On September 13, 1948, David Ben-Gurion requested the destruction of Al-'Abbasiyya, among other Palestinian villages whose inhabitants fled or were expelled.

Between 1948 and 1954  the Israeli sites of Yehud, Magshimim, Ganne Yehuda, Ganne Tiqwa, and Savyon were established on the land of Al-'Abbasiyya.

In 1992 the village site was described: "The main mosque and the shrine of al-Nabi Huda till stand. The mosque is deserted and beginning to crack in several places; the shrine is made of stone and surmounted with a dome. There is also an Israeli coffee shop, called the Tehr coffee shop, at the entrance of a main street that was called Ziqaq al-Raml ("Sand Lane"). A number of houses remain; they have been occupied by Yehud's Jewish residents or put to other uses. One residentil house, made of concrete, has a slanted roof and rectangular doors and windows; its porch is covered by corrugated metal sheets. Another house, a two-storey, concrete structure with rectangular doors and windows and I tiled, tent-shaped roof, has been converted into a commercial building. The land around the site (only partially covered by construction) has been left untended and is overgrown with pine and Christ's-thorn trees."

References

Bibliography

External links
Welcome To al-'Abbasiyya
 al-'Abbasiyya (Yahudiyya), Zochrot
Survey of Western Palestine, Map 13: IAA,  Wikimedia commons
Al-'Abbasiyya at Khalil Sakakini Cultural Center

Arab villages depopulated during the 1948 Arab–Israeli War
District of Jaffa